Virgil Solis or Virgilius Solis (1514 – 1 August 1562), a member of a prolific family of artists, was a German draughtsman and printmaker in engraving, etching and woodcut who worked in his native city of Nuremberg.

Biography 
His prints were sold separately (mainly the etchings and engravings) or formed the illustrations of books (normally the woodcuts); many prints signed by him are probably by assistants. After his death his widow married his assistant and continued the workshop into the early seventeenth century.

His woodcuts illustrating Ovid were especially influential, though partly borrowing from earlier illustrations by the French artist Bernard Salomon.  They were reprinted and copied in many different editions, in Latin and translations into various languages; the Ovid from which the illustration at right has been taken was printed at Frankfurt in 1581. He published an armorial of the Holy Roman Empire in 1555. Jost Amman was an assistant of Solis' before starting his own workshop.

Solis eventually died in Nuremberg. Eduard von Ubisch wrote a comprehensive description of Solis' life and work in relation to the Bible images in 1889.

External links

Virgil Solis, 183 illustrations to Ovid's Metamorphoses, Frankfurt-am-Main, 1581
1563 Illustrated Edition of Ovid's Metamorphoses, Internet Archive, page by page photographs of complete book from The Norris Museum, St Ives, Cambridgeshire, UK. Catalogue Numbers 90 and 200.
A very adequate amount of information about editions of Ovid and their illustrations, from the University of Virginia
Biblische Figuren des Alten Testaments / Biblische Figuren des Neuwen Testaments. Internet Archive, page by page photographs of complete book from The Norris Museum, St Ives, Cambridgeshire, UK. Catalogue Numbers 89 and 201.
Virgil Solis' Wappenbüchlein (1555)
Holdings in the Deutsche Nationalbibliothek
Virgil Solis und seine biblischen Illustrationen für den Holzschnitt (1889) publisher Ramm & Seemann.

1514 births
1562 deaths
Artists from Nuremberg
German draughtsmen
Heraldic artists
German printmakers